The 1994 Cal State Northridge Matadors football team represented California State University, Northridge as a member of the  American West Conference (AWC) during the 1994 NCAA Division I-AA football season. Led by Bob Burt in his ninth and final season as head coach, Cal State Northridge compiled an overall record of 3–7 with a mark of 0–3 in conference play, placing last out of four teams in the AWC. The team was outscored by its opponents 290 to 246 for the season. The Matadors played home games at North Campus Stadium in Northridge, California.

Schedule

References

Cal State Northridge
Cal State Northridge Matadors football seasons
Cal State Northridge Matadors football